Joseph Haydn's Symphony No. 16 in B-flat major, Hoboken I/16, may have been written between 1757 and 1761.

It is scored for 2 oboes, bassoon, 2 horns, strings and continuo, with a solo cello part in the slow movement. It is in three movements:

Allegro, 
Andante in E-flat major, 
Allegro or Presto, 

The slow movement features a solo cello doubled in octaves with muted violins.

References

External links
 

Symphony 016
Compositions in B-flat major